Julio Peralta and Horacio Zeballos were the defending champions but chose not to defend their title.

Marcelo Arévalo and Sergio Galdós won the title after defeating Ariel Behar and Gonzalo Escobar 6–4, 6–1 in the final.

Seeds

Draw

References
 Main Draw

Open Bogota – Doubles
2016 in tennis